Yorkin is a surname. Notable people with the surname include:

Bud Yorkin (1926–2015), American film producer
Nicole Yorkin, American television writer
 David Yorkin, American Writer
Peg Yorkin, American activist
Yevgeny Yorkin (1932–1994), Soviet ice hockey player